Cherish is the forty-fifth studio album by Seiko Matsuda. It came in two different versions, a regular edition which contains the CD album and a first press special edition that contained the CD album plus a 36-page photobook. The album release wasn't preceded by any single release, so all the songs in the album are new songs.

Track listing

Charts

References

2011 albums